Surendra Kumar Sinha (born 1 February 1951), commonly known as SK Sinha is a Bangladeshi lawyer and jurist who served as the 21st Chief Justice of Bangladesh. He resigned from the position in November 2017 amid the 16th amendment verdict controversy.

Early life and education
Sinha was born in a Kshatriya Family in the present-day Tilakpur village in Kamalganj, Moulvibazar District in 1951 to Bishnupriya Manipuri parents, Lalit Mohan Sinha and Dhanabati Sinha. He obtained his bachelor of laws degree in 1974 from the Sylhet Law College.

Career
Sinha enrolled as an advocate of the District Court, Sylhet in 1974 and practiced in that court under the guidance of two civil and criminal lawyers and conducted sessions trial cases independently till the end of 1977. He obtained the permission to practice before the High Court Division and Appellate Division of the Supreme Court of Bangladesh in 1978 and 1990 respectively.

Sinha was elevated as a judge of the High Court Division on 24 October 1999. On 16 July 2009 he was appointed judge of the appellate division of the Supreme Court of Bangladesh. He assumed the office of the chairman of the Bangladesh Judicial Service Commission in June 2011 and the office of the Chief Justice of Bangladesh on 17 January 2015.

Sinha attended several conferences regarding judicial affairs.

Sinha is known for a number of high-profile judgments including those on the killing of former President Sheikh Mujibur Rahman and the 5th and 13th amendments to the Constitution of Bangladesh.

The 16th amendment verdict
The 16th amendment of the constitution of Bangladesh was passed by the parliament on 17 September 2014 which would give power to Jatiya Sangsad to remove judges if allegations of incapability or misconduct against them are proved. On 5 May 2016, a special High Court bench declared the amendment illegal and unconstitutional.  On 4 January 2017, the government challenged the verdict by filing an appeal with the appellate division and on 3 July, a seven-member Supreme Court bench headed by Sinha unanimously rejected the appeal upholding the High Court verdict. Following the full verdict release on 1 August, the prime minister and senior ministers publicly criticized Sinha for the decision. The Jatiya Sangsad on September 13 passed a resolution calling for legal steps to nullify the Supreme Court verdict.

Fallout

Sinha went on one month's leave since 3 October 2017 and traveled to Australia on 13 October. Justice Md. Abdul Wahhab Miah was appointed to discharge the duties of the chief justice in the absence of Sinha. Earlier, law minister Anisul Huq said Sinha went on the leave for treatment as he was suffering from cancer. Sinha later rejected this claim. Bangladesh National Party spokesperson alleged Sinha was forced to leave.

On 14 October, a day after Sinha left the country, the Supreme Court released a statement citing 11 charges against him including money laundering, financial irregularities, corruption and moral turpitude. According to the statement, on 30 September, President Abdul Hamid handed over documentary evidence over those allegations to four other appellate division justices. It added, upon meeting with those justices, Sinha submitted his application to the president on 2 October for one month's leave. On 10 November, he flew to Canada when his 39-day leave expired. A day later, he sent his resignation letter to President Hamid. Sinha was scheduled to retire on 31 January 2018.

On 10 July 2019, the Anti-Corruption Commission sued Sinha and 10 others on the charge of misappropriating and laundering about Tk 4 crore from the Farmers Bank in 2016. A day later, Sinha rejected the allegations against him but said he would not defend himself in court, he had committed no wrong and that Sheikh Hasina’s government had been misusing the law. According to a Canadian online news portal, The Star, Sinha crossed into Canada through Fort Erie from the United States on 4 July and filed a refugee claim.

On 6 January 2020, Judge KM Emrul Kayesh of the Senior Special Judge’s Court of Dhaka issued arrest warrants against Sinha and 10 others as they have been shown fugitives in the charge-sheets.

On 31 March 2022, ACC filed a case against Sinha and his brother, Ananta Kumar Sinha, over allegations of illegal earning and money laundering of $280,000.

Personal life
Sinha is married to Sushama Sinha. He sought asylum in USA, but was denied then he crossed the border to Canada and sought asylum there.

Biography

Sinha published his autobiography A Broken Dream: Rule of Law, Human Rights and Democracy on 19 September 2018. In the book, he gave first-hand accounts of government agencies intimidating the judges to serve verdicts in favour of the government, ruled by Awami League. In a sensational revelation, he alleged that the country's military intelligence agency Directorate General of Forces Intelligence (DGFI), forced him to leave the country and offer the resignation. DGFI spokesperson Brigadier general Tanveer Mazhar Siddique, later denied the allegation saying, "DGFI never threatens any person or does anything like this".

References 

Living people
1951 births
People from Kamalganj Upazila
University of Chittagong alumni
20th-century Bangladeshi lawyers
Bangladeshi Hindus
Supreme Court of Bangladesh justices
Chief justices of Bangladesh
Bishnupriya Manipuri people
21st-century Bangladeshi judges